2010 Desafio Internacional das Estrelas was the sixth edition of Desafio Internacional das Estrelas (International Challenge of the Stars) with Michael Schumacher not defending his title. Races scheduled for 18–19 December at Arena Sapiens Park in Florianópolis-SC. The event was won by Lucas di Grassi after he won Race 1 and retired in Race 2.

Participants

Final classification

References

External links
  

Desafio Internacional das Estrelas
Desafio Internacional das Estrelas
Desafio Internacional das Estrelas